NBCC may stand for:

National Black Catholic Congress
National Board for Certified Counselors
National Building Code of Canada
New Brunswick Community College
National Black Chamber of Commerce
National Book Critics Circle
National Breast Cancer Coalition
NBCC (India) Limited (National Buildings Construction Corporation),  Govt. of India
Nagaland Baptist Church Council